Arthur Yitzhak Biram (Hebrew: ארתור בירם; August 13, 1878 – June 5, 1967) was a German–Israeli philosopher, philologist, and educator.

Biography 
Biram was born in Bischofswerda in Saxony in 1878 and attended school in Hirschberg, Silesia.

He studied languages, including Arabic, at University of Berlin and at University of Leipzig and earned a doctorate (Dr. phil.) at the University of Leipzig in 1902, discussing the philosophy of Abu-Rasid al-Nisaburi. In 1904 he concluded the rabbi seminar at the Hochschule für die Wissenschaft des Judentums. Afterwards he taught languages and literature at the Berlinisches Gymnasium zum Grauen Kloster.

Biram was one of the founders of the Bar-Kochba club, and a member of the German liberal religious stream 'Ezra', which recognized the importance of high school education. In 1913, he emigrated to Ottoman Palestine.

He married Hannah Tomeshevsky, and they had two sons. Both sons were killed: Aharon died in an accident while on reserve duty, and Binyamin, an engineer at the Dead Sea Works, was killed by a mine.

Pedagogic career
Biram founded the Hebrew Reali School in Haifa in 1913 and was appointed its first principal, but a few months later, World War I broke out, and Biram was drafted by the German army and stationed in Afula. In 1919, he returned to school.

As part of Biram's philosophy of education, in 1937 he implemented compulsory Hagam training for girls in the Hebrew Reali School in Haifa, laying the foundation for recruitment of women in the Haganah, and later the Israel Defense Forces.

In 1948, he resigned his post as principal, and on his 75th birthday, he authored a collection of essays on the Bible. Altogether, he wrote about 50 publications in Hebrew, German, English, and Arabic. Biram died in Haifa in 1967.

Awards and recognition 
In 1954, he was awarded the Israel Prize for education.

See also 
List of Israel Prize recipients

References

Further reading 
 Socio-Educational Dilemmas: a typology illustrated by the history of Hebrew education in Haifa during the British Mandate, by Yuval Dror, article in the Journal of Educational Administration and History, 1478-7431, Volume 26, Issue 1, 1994, Pages 35 – 54, 
 Encyclopedia of Zionism and Israel, by Raphael Patai, Vol. 1, Herzl Press, 1971
 Uwe Fiedler: Er gründete in Haifa eine Schule. BoD – Books on Demand, 2017 (in German)
 Streetwise: Rehov Biram, Haifa, written by Wendy Blumfeld
 Publications about resp. by Arthur Biram at WorldCat
 Biography at the Upper Lusatian Science Society (archived, in German)

1878 births
1967 deaths
People from Bischofswerda
People from the Kingdom of Saxony
19th-century German Jews
German emigrants to the Ottoman Empire
Jews in Ottoman Palestine
Jews in Mandatory Palestine
Israeli educators
Jewish educators
Humboldt University of Berlin alumni
Leipzig University alumni
Israel Prize in education recipients
Hochschule für die Wissenschaft des Judentums alumni